Lotrifen, also known as trazisoquine and sold under the brand names Canocenta and Privaprol, is an abortifacient which is used in veterinary medicine. It was described in 1978.

References

Further reading 

 
 

Abortifacients
Chloroarenes
Isoquinolines
Triazolopyridines
Veterinary drugs